Bottnaryd Church is a historic church building in Bottnaryd, Sweden. It is located in Jönköping Municipality, Jönköping County, Sweden. The church  is situated next to the lake  Gårdsjön.

The church belongs to the  Norra Mo Parish  within the Diocese of Skara of the Church of Sweden. It was built in the late 17th century, replacing a Medieval church demolished in May 1666. The new church was completed in May 1695. The church is built entirely of wood. South of the church stands a wooden bell tower built in 1686.  
The church has a sandstone baptismal font dating from the Middle Ages. The altarpiece was created in northern Germany in the early 17th century and the wood-carved pulpit with canopy dates from 1670. Between 1886 and 1890, the church under went re-construction under the direction of architect Helgo Zettervall (1831–1907).

References

External links
Norra Mo parish website

17th-century Church of Sweden church buildings
Churches in Jönköping Municipality
Wooden churches in Sweden
Churches completed in 1667
Churches in the Diocese of Växjö